Augusto Schott (born 17 January 2000) is an Argentine professional footballer who plays as a right-back for Colón, on loan from Talleres.

Club career
Schott had youth stints with Centro Vecinal San Miguel and Cultural Arroyito before joining the ranks of Talleres in 2014; appearing for the latter at the 2018 U-20 Copa Libertadores in Uruguay. After featuring in friendlies which saw him score against Huracán and Godoy Cruz, the player was promoted into Talleres' competitive first-team for a Copa de la Liga Profesional match with Newell's Old Boys on 30 October 2020. He was named on the substitutes' bench, though would replace Nahuel Tenaglia with nine minutes remaining of a 3–1 victory.

International career
Schott represented Argentina's U19s at the 2018 South American Games in Bolivia. He also received training summons from the U20s.

Career statistics
.

Notes

References

External links

2000 births
Living people
Footballers from Córdoba, Argentina
Argentine people of German descent
Argentine footballers
Argentina youth international footballers
Association football defenders
Association football midfielders
Talleres de Córdoba footballers
Club Atlético Platense footballers
Club Atlético Colón footballers
Argentine Primera División players